The Boston Arena Hockey Club, colloquially known as the Boston Arenas, were an American amateur ice hockey team from Boston, Massachusetts. The Boston Arenas played its home games at the Boston Arena (now Matthews Arena) at 238 St. Botolph Street in Boston.

History
The Boston Arenas played exhibition games in 1914–15, and in 1915–16 the club played in the Boston City Hockey League. For the 1916–17 season the club joined the American Amateur Hockey League where it played against its main city rival the Boston Athletic Association, as well as against two teams from New York City: the Brooklyn Crescents and the New York Irish-Americans. In 1917–18 the club played in the United States National Hockey League (USNHL).

NHL alumni
 Raymie Skilton – Montreal Wanderers, one game in 1917–18
 Mickey Roach – Toronto St. Pats, Hamilton Tigers, New York Americans, 1919–1927

References

Notes

1914 establishments in Massachusetts
Defunct ice hockey teams in the United States
Ice hockey clubs established in 1914
Arenas